The 2022 Golden Globe Race is the third edition of the original Sunday Times Golden Globe Race. The race, a solo around-the-world sailing race, started on 4 September 2022 from Les Sables-d'Olonne in France. Similar to the 2018 event, the solo-sailors gathered for the SITraN Prologue in Gijón (Spain) on 14 August 2022, before sailing to Les Sables-d'Olonne for the GGR Race Village, which opened on 21 August 2022.

Retro sailing
As with the 2018 Golden Globe Race, entrants are limited to sailing similar yachts and equipment to what was available to Sir Robin Knox-Johnston, the winner of the original race in 1968–69. That means sailing without the use of modern technology such as satellite based navigation aids. Safety equipment such as EPIRBs and AIS are carried, however the competitors are only allowed to use the technology in an emergency.

Competitors could apply to have their class of boat approved, providing it complies with the following rules:

 Constructed of fibre reinforced plastic.
 Designed prior to 1988, with a minimum series of 20 yachts built from one mould.
Bowsprits, wind vanes and outboard rudders, boomkins, pushpits and pulpits are not measured.
 Has a full-length keel with rudders attached to the trailing edge.
 A minimum design displacement of

Route
The race started on 4 September 2022 in Les Sables-d'Olonne and leads around the world eastward, leaving Cape of Good Hope, Cape Leeuwin and Cape Horn to port. There are four "film gates" along the route - Lanzarote, Cape Town, Hobart and Punta del Este - where the skippers can be interviewed as they sail past without stopping and where they can pass over films and letters.

Entrants
The following 16 skippers started the race:

The race
The race started on 4 September 2022, with the competitors passing a rolling gate between the yachts Galiana and L’Esprit d’Equipe. The official starter was Sir Robin Knox-Johnston, the winner of the original Golden Globe Race.

Race standings as of 17 February 2023:

References

External links
 Official website

Golden Globe Race
Golden Globe Race
Golden Globe Race